The Port Royal Experiment was a program begun during the American Civil War in which former slaves successfully worked on the land abandoned by planters. In 1861 the Union captured the Sea Islands off the coast of South Carolina and their main harbor, Port Royal. The white residents fled, leaving behind 10,000 black slaves. Several private Northern charity organizations stepped in to help the former slaves become self-sufficient. The result was a model of what Reconstruction could have been. The African Americans demonstrated their ability to work the land efficiently and live independently of white control. They assigned themselves daily tasks for cotton growing and spent their extra time cultivating their own crops, fishing and hunting. By selling their surplus crops, the locals acquired small amounts of property.

Among the Northerners who arrived as teachers were Mary Lambert Allen and her husband William Francis Allen from West Newton, MA.  Detailed descriptions of their daily life are provided in his diaries which have been transcribed. Admiration for the hard work ethic of the former slaves is mentioned, as well as the urgent need for a basic education of which they had been deprived. Allen also took notes on the language, songs and music he heard which he later published. In 1862, General Ormsby M. Mitchel helped African Americans to found the town of Mitchelville on Hilton Head Island. In 1865 President Andrew Johnson ended the experiment, returning the land to its previous white owners.

In February 1862, a report was made to the Treasury Dept. which gives an indication of the territory held in the Port Royal Experiment:
 An estimate of the number of plantations open to cultivation, and of the persons upon the territory protected by the forces of the United States, if only approximate to the truth, may prove convenient in providing a proper system of administration. The following islands are thus protected, and the estimated number of plantations upon each is given:

Or about two hundred in all.

There are several other islands thus protected, without plantations, as Otter, Pritchard, Fripp, Hunting and Phillips. Lemon and Daw have not been explored by the agents engaged in collecting cotton. The populous island of North Edisto, lying in the direction of Charleston, and giving the name to the finest cotton, is still visited by the rebels. A part near Botany Bay Island is commanded by the guns of one of our war vessels, under which a colony of one thousand negroes sought protection, where they have been temporarily subsisted from its stores. The number has within a few days been stated to have increased to 2300.

---E. L. Pierce, The Negroes at Port Royal: Report of E. L. Pierce, Government Agent, to the Hon. Salmon P. Chase, Secretary of the Treasury, 1862

In the summer of 1862, Union troops protecting coastal colonies began to withdraw to reinforce Union General George B. McClellan who was engaged in the Peninsula Campaign, a series of battle between March and July. Many of the colonies were consolidated. One example was the migration of camps at Edisto Island to St. Helena Island.

Education

A special education commission was established by Secretary of the Treasury Salmon P. Chase. E. L. Pierce was the Government Agent overseeing the experiment. The committee was looking for teachers who were sent not only to educate the former slaves but also to aid them on how to govern themselves in normal society. The candidate was also responsible for intellectual, moral, and religious instruction. The Boston Educational Commission for Freedmen was established in response to a call made by E.L. Pierce as a philanthropic organization. Around the same time, the Port Royal Relief Committee of Philadelphia was formed.  A New York organization united with the Boston organizations to provide relief and education for the former slaves. Many more relief organizations were established from different parts of the country.  Hundreds of teachers were sent to different parts of the South.

Around March 14, 1862, more than 15p special position to the special education commission, and 35 candidates were initially chosen. One of the candidates was prominent educator from Ohio John Celivergos Zachos with whom Salmon P. Chase was familiar as senator and governor of Ohio.

The Phonic Primer and Reader was a book published by John Celivergos Zachos.  The book was intended to educate the freed slaves. Zachos, as well as Susan Walker, traveled to Port Royal from Ohio. The Boston and New York Education Commissions sent Zachos to prove that the former slaves could be educated. Zachos was on Parris Island on March 13, 1862, and he was in command of 400 freed slaves on a plantation. He spent a total of 16 months at Parris Island, where he took on many roles: army surgeon, teacher, and storekeeper. He was also in charge of the military stronghold under General Rufus Saxton.

Zachos tried to teach the former slaves and studied their ability to learn. The professor realized that older slaves had a hard time because of the years of psychological abuse and torture. Zachos noted it was easier to educate the younger slaves. Towards the end of 1863, Zachos traveled back to Boston. In early 1864, Zachos assembled a group of Irish and German uneducated immigrants, both male and female. The test subjects did not speak or read English.

Zachos assembled a curriculum to instruct the test subjects based on the needs of the former slaves and their ability to learn. Early on, the professor did not have a book and so was forced to use charts and the chalkboard.  The pupils had to wait until March 1864 to receive the first book, which had an extremely long title, The Phonic Primer and Reader, A National Method of teaching Reading by the Sounds of the Letters without altering the Orthography. Designed Chiefly for the Use of Night-Schools Where Adults are Taught, and for the Myriads of Freed Men and Women, Whose First Rush from the Prison-House of Slavery is to the Gates of the Temple of Knowledge.

The experiment concluded that the technique created during his time at Port Royal was effective enough to teach adults. It was a simple method that used a unique phonic teaching method of teaching English reading by the sounds of letters. The research was presented to the Boston and New York Education Commissions and published in the Journal of The Massachusetts Teachers Association. The same year, an official book was published to educate the former adult slaves, Phonic Primer and Reader. Thus was coined the phrase Port Royal Experiment. After his work, Salmon P. Chase gave Zachos an extraordinary recommendation.

The Port Royal Experiment initiated a systematic outcry for the education of the freed slaves. A massive number of organizations were established and continued educating the freed people. On March 3, 1865, roughly two months before the end of the Civil War, the Freedmen's Bureau was established.  Within the next five years, it had established 4239 schools, employed 9307 teachers, and instructed 247,333 students. The higher education of African Americans was the bureau's responsibility.  In many instances there was opposition among the white people of the South; moreover, in one state, the opposition became widely organized. At the same time, many former slavemasters reportedly assisted in establishing schools for the slaves and became their teachers.

On May 16, 1866, a convention was held in Cleveland, Ohio, and formed the American Freedman's Union Commission. The Boston Educational Commission became the New England Branch, and the New York National Freedmen's Relief Association became the New York Branch. Many other such philanthropic organizations also merged into different branches of the American Freedman's Union Commission with the intention of the proliferation of the education of African-Americans.

See also 
 Hilton Head Island, South Carolina
 Hurricane Plantation, Davis Bend, Mississippi
 Mitchelville
 Port Royal, South Carolina

References

Bibliography

 Faragher, John Mack, ed. (1998), The American Heritage Encyclopedia of American History, Henry Holt & Co., 1998.
 Foner, Eric (2001) "The Civil War and the Story of American Freedom", Art Institute of Chicago Museum Studies, 27(1): pp. 8–101.
 Ochiai, Akiko (2001) "The Port Royal Experiment Revisited: Northern Visions of Reconstruction and the Land Question", The New England Quarterly. 2001 Mar; 74(1):94-117.
 Rose, Willie Lee Nichols (1999) Rehearsal for Reconstruction the Port Royal experiment, Athens: University of Georgia Press.

African-American society
African Americans in the American Civil War
Reconstruction Era
Social history of the American Civil War
South Carolina in the American Civil War
1861 establishments in the United States
Gullah history
African-American history of South Carolina
19th-century American slaves